Matlab Dakshin (Bengali: মতলব দক্ষিণ, romanized: Motlob Dakshin, lit. 'Matlab South') is an upazila of Chandpur District in the division of Chittagong, Bangladesh. The former Matlab Upazila was divided into two in 2000, Matlab Dakshin and Matlab Uttar.

Geography
It has a total land area of 131.69 km2.

Administration
Matlab Dakshin Upazila is divided into 2 municipalities and 5 union parishads.

Municipality:

 Matlab Municipality
 Narayanpur Municipality

Union Parishad:

 Nayergaon Uttar
 Nayergaon Dakshin
 Khadergaon
 Upadi Uttar
 Upadi Dakshin

Matlab Municipality is subdivided into 9 wards and 30 mahallas. And Narayanpur Municipality is subdivided into 9 wards and 24 mahallas

Notable people 
 Shahed Ali Patwary- Deputy Speaker and member of East Pakistan Provincial Assembly.
 A. T. M. Abdul Mateen- Deputy Speaker and Member of the 4th National Assembly of Pakistan as a representative of East Pakistan.
 AB Siddique- a drafter of the Constitution of Bangladesh and member of parliament.
 Mohammad Rafiqul Islam- was a former Chief of Bangladesh Air Force and member of parliament.
 Dr. Shoeb Ahmed Patwary-  was an Adviser of Ministry of Commerce

See also
Upazilas of Bangladesh
Districts of Bangladesh
Divisions of Bangladesh

References

Upazilas of Chandpur District